The Chinese Taipei women's national field hockey team represents Taiwan in women's international field hockey competitions and is controlled by the Chinese Taipei Hockey Association, the governing body for field hockey in Taiwan.

Taiwan participated twice in the Asian Games and thrice in the Asia Cup.

Tournament record

Asian Games
 2006 – 6th place
 2018 – 8th place

Asia Cup
 2007 – 7th place
 2009 – 9th place
 2013 – 7th place

AHF Cup
1997 – 5th place
2012 – 
2016 –

See also
Chinese Taipei men's national field hockey team

References

National team
Asian women's national field hockey teams
Field hockey